Wang Gang (born October 1942) is a retired Chinese politician. He served in prominent leadership positions in the Chinese Communist Party (CCP) after 1999, including Director of the General Office of the CCP and Secretary of the Secretariat. He was a member of the Politburo from 2007 to 2012.

Biography
Wang was born in Fuyu County, Jilin Province, and graduated from the department of philosophy of Jilin University in 1967. He joined the CCP in June 1971. Between 1977 and 1981 he served on the administrative staff of the Communist Party's regional committee in Xinjiang. Between 1981 and 1985 he was a secretary in the Communist Party's office on managing relations with Taiwan. He was later responsible for the State Bureau for Letters and Calls and the State Archives Administration. Between 1999 and 2001 he became of the Director of the General Office of the CCP.

Wang was an alternate member of the 15th Central Committee of the CCP, an alternate member of the 16th Politburo of the CCP and a Secretary of the Secretariat of the CCP.

He became a full member of the 17th Politburo of the CCP in 2007, joining the inner sanctum of power in the CCP. Between 2008 and 2013 Wang served as one of the Vice Chairman of the 11th Chinese People's Political Consultative Conference (CPPCC), and the secretary of a working committee of organs directly affiliated to the Central Committee of the CCP.

Wang retired from public life in 2013.

References

1942 births
Living people
People's Republic of China politicians from Jilin
Jilin University alumni
Chinese Communist Party politicians from Jilin
People from Songyuan
Members of the Secretariat of the Chinese Communist Party
Members of the 17th Politburo of the Chinese Communist Party
Vice Chairpersons of the National Committee of the Chinese People's Political Consultative Conference
Directors of the General Office of the Chinese Communist Party